The Treaty of Sistova ended the last Austro-Turkish war (1787–91). Brokered by Great Britain, Prussia and the Netherlands, it was signed in Sistova (modern Svishtov) in Bulgaria on 4 August 1791. The treaty was written in French and Turkish.

Background
The Habsburg monarchy had been pushed back in the first year of the war but then conquered Belgrade and gained other victory near Calafat in 1790. Austria's ally, Russia, had also been very successful, but Austria was threatened with invasion by Prussia. Also, the French Revolution had broken out and demanded Austria's urgent attention. Under that pressure, Austria accepted only very meagre gains from the war: only the town of Orsova (modern Orșova) and several small places (Cetingrad, Drežnik, Lapac, Srb) on the Croatian frontier were ceded to the Habsburg Monarchy.

This treaty ended the Austro-Ottoman wars. Austria did not participate in the Russian-led wars against the Ottomans during the 19th and 20th centuries. Both countries would eventually face France in the War of the Second Coalition, despite fighting different campaigns against the same enemy in Central Europe and Egypt. During the Second Ottoman-Egyptian War, Austria, along with Britain, saved its old rival from early collapse against Muhammad Ali of Egypt's Egypt. The two countries would end up teaming against the Allies of World War I, with the Ottomans sending troops to Galicia and the Austro-Hungarians to Gaza before collapsing together.

With the Turkish war ended, Austria joined with Prussia in the Declaration of Pillnitz on August 27. Austria renounced any expansion at the expense of the Ottoman Empire. In return, Prussia promised not to expand to the east and not to support the Brabant Revolution. Both countries pledged to intervene in France if all of the various powers of Europe agreed that it was necessary.

See also
 Habsburg-occupied Serbia (1788–92)

References

Further reading
 
 

1791 in Austria
1791 in the Habsburg monarchy
1791 in the Ottoman Empire
1791 treaties
Sistova
Sistova
Sistova
Svishtov
Habsburg monarchy–Ottoman Empire relations
Bilateral treaties of the Ottoman Empire